Daira Mir Momin, (Urdu: , also called Daira-i-Mir Momin), is a Muslim cemetery located in the Old City of Hyderabad.

History 
It was established during the Qutb Shahi period in the 16th century around the grave of Mir Momin Astarabadi, who was the minister of the Golconda Sultanate and the planner of Hyderabad. It is said that he ordered camel-loads of soil to be brought from Karbala and sprinkled across the graveyard.

The graveyard is in poor condition and is encroached by several illegal constructions.

Notable burials 

 Mir Momin Astarabadi
Mir Alam, former Prime Minister of Hyderabad.
 Salar Jung I, former Prime Minister of Hyderabad.
 Salar Jung II, former Prime Minister of Hyderabad.
 Salar Jung III, former Prime Minister of Hyderabad.
 Prince Moazzam Jah
 Bade Ghulam Ali Khan, classical musician.

Tomb of Mir Momin 
The tomb of Mir Momin, located in the center, contains a number of Persian inscriptions.

References 

Muslim cemeteries
Cemeteries in India
Islam in Hyderabad, India
16th-century establishments in India